ICT University is an accredited private university located in Yaounde, Cameroon. It aims to provide ICT and Managerial Human Capacity Development in developing countries.

Background
ICT University started in 2010 and it currently serves more than 15,000 students via on-site and online programs around the World.The University develops productive and relevant Diploma, Bachelors, Masters and Doctoral level scholars to utilize their research and training in solving the substantial problems in their countries.

Programs and departments
Bachelors of science in Natural science
Bachelors of science in accounting
Bachelors of science in ICT
Masters of Arts in Regional Development Planning
Masters of science in Applied statistics
Masters of science in Information and communication technology
Masters of science in Information systems and networking
Masters of science in public health
Masters of science in Telecommunication
Masters in Business management and sustainable development
Masters in International Business Administration
PhD in public health
PhD in Business Administration
PhD in Business Administration for Sustainable Development 
PhD in Software Engineering
PhD in Data Communication and Networking
PhD in Telecommunication
PhD in Information and Communication Technology

ICT University Foundation
The ICT University Foundation is registered and chartered in the USA. It is the funding organ of all ICT University campuses. It also funds donations of ICT equipment, E-Learning laboratories and E-Libraries for many universities in developing nations in Africa. The headquarter of African campuses is in Cameroon. The University's Cameroon campus is accredited by Cameroon Ministry of Higher Education in 2012.

Research Center
The Professors Terry and Linda Byrd Research Centre is hosted by ICT University and it is a research institution that examines, analyses, surveys, assesses, grades, and understands so-called exponential technologies and their utilisation in advancing the business, health, education, and general welfare of humanity, especially in the Sub Saharan Africa region.

ICT University Information and Communications Department created the ICT Center for Cybersecurity Studies in 2020 and offering courses in Cybersecurity and Data Privacy. These courses are tailored around the Confidentiality, Integrity, and Available and enable graduates to potentially earn Certification from ISACA or ISC2.

References

American University
Educational institutions established in 2010
Universities and colleges in Cameroon
Universities in Cameroon
Universities and colleges in Nigeria
Universities and colleges in Africa
2010 establishments in Cameroon